Canalete is a district of the Upala canton, in the Alajuela province of Costa Rica.

History 
Canalete was created on 3 August 2012 by Acuerdo Ejecutivo N° 35-2012-MGP.

Geography 
Canalete has an area of  km² and an elevation of  metres.

Demographics 

For the 2011 census, Canalete had not been created, therefore no population data is available until the next census in 2021.

Transportation

Road transportation 
The district is covered by the following road routes:
 National Route 6
 National Route 164
 National Route 729
 National Route 730

References 

Districts of Alajuela Province
Populated places in Alajuela Province